The 2014 OEC Taipei WTA Challenger-Doubles was a professional tennis tournament played on indoor carpet courts. It was the seventh edition of OEC's Taipei Open tournaments, and the third under the 125k series classification. It was part of the 2014 WTA 125K series. It took place in Taipei, Taiwan, on 3–9 November 2014. Caroline Garcia and Yaroslava Shvedova were the defending champions, however, Shvedova chose not to participate and Garcia chose to compete in Limoges instead.

Chan Hao-ching and Chan Yung-jan won the title, defeating Chang Kai-chen and Chuang Chia-jung in the all-Taiwanese final, 6–4, 6–3.

Seeds

Draw

References 

 Draw

OEC Taipei WTA Challenger - Doubles
Taipei WTA Ladies Open
2014 in Taiwanese tennis